The Triad Theater, formerly known as Palsson's Supper Club, Steve McGraw's, and Stage 72, is a cabaret-style performing arts venue located on West 72nd Street on New York's Upper West Side. The theatre has been the original home to some of the longest running Off-Broadway shows including Forever Plaid, Forbidden Broadway, Spamilton, and Secrets Every Smart Traveler Should Know.

The Triad Theater is currently owned and operated by Peter Martin and partner Rick Newman, founder of New York's famed comedy and music venue, Catch a Rising Star.

History 
The Theater was built in 1984 and was the original home of four of the most successful shows in off-Broadway History, including Forbidden Broadway, Forever Plaid, and Spamilton, as well as Celebrity Autobiography; the hit comedy show is now in its ninth year at the venue. A month-long workshop production of Seth Rudetsky’s show Disaster! went on to a Broadway production at the Nederlander Theater.     

Some of the notable performers who have performed on the Triad stage include Martin Short, Kristen Wiig, Kevin Hart, Ryan Reynolds, Matthew Broderick, Bob Weir of Grateful Dead, Vanessa Williams, Jake LaMotta, Brooke Shields, Paul Rudd, David Steinberg, Slash, George Benson, Gregg Allman, Gavin DeGraw, Bebe Neuwirth, Jim Dale, Peter Boyle, Tracy Morgan, Tommy Tune, Ben Vereen, Air Supply, Dion, and many others from the worlds of comedy, music and theater. Lady Gaga made her professional debut on our stage as part of the Circle in the Square Cabaret Program. In the 1980s, Christopher Walken, Elizabeth Taylor, Liza Minnelli, Jack Nicholson, Robert De Niro and many other well known performers would use the Triad for their own weekly private performances.     

The Triad Theater has also been used as a location for photo and film shoots; these include an episode of the Hulu comedy Difficult People, episodes of the interview series Speakeasy for Front and Center, and the cover photo shoot of Adrien Brody for Manhattan Magazine and Miami Magazine.

Productions
Productions at Stage 72 have included:

Forever Plaid (Original Production)
Forbidden Broadway (Original Production)
Celebrity Autobiography: In Their Own Words (Original Production)
Secrets Every Smart Traveler Should Know
A Couple of Blaguards (Frank McCourt) (Based on the Pulitzer Prize-winning Angela's Ashes)
American Rhapsody: A New Musical Revue (Gershwin)
Berlin to Broadway
Loose Lips (with Bebe Neuwirth and Peter Boyle)
Love is French by French singer Floanne
Hello Muddah Hello Faddah (featured Alan Dershowitz)
Nunsense (For the Holiday)
Forbidden Hollywood
Who Killed Woody Allen?
Boobs! The Musical
Last Jew in Europe
Love, Linda: The Life Of Mrs. Cole Porter
Katie Goodman's I Didn't F*ck It Up
You've Got Hate Mail
Disaster! (Pre-Broadway Tryout)
Spamilton
From My Hometown
Kaballah with Emily Stern
Jim Dale (Pre-Broadway Tryout)
Bill Bogg’s Talk Show Confidential
Broadway Cares/Equity Fights AIDS Cabaret Series also got its start Triad.
Mercury Show with Andrea McCardle (Original Annie)
My Son The Waiter, A Jewish Tragedy
Dion (Pre-Broadway Tryout)
The Party Songs of Ruth Wallace
Mark Felt Superstar
Bush is Bad
Kurt Weil Berlin to Broadway
Jacque Brel Returns
Doug Bernstein Showing Off
Music of Maurey Festoon
Ruthless the Musical
Trump Family Special
Me The People
Tommy Tune (Pr-Broadway Tryout)
Broadway's Next Hit Musical

Music

Gregg Allman
Air Supply
Marc Cohn
Vanessa Carlton
Cher
Gavin DeGraw
Sean Lennon
Lenny Kravitz
Ace Frehley
Lady Gaga (Performance Debut)
Tony Garnier (Bob Dylan's bassist)
Debbie Gibson 
Debby Harry
Christopher Cross
Joey Fatone
Art Garfunkel
Ratdog
Melissa Manchester
Joey Fatone
Jackie Paris
Jeff Pevar
Slash
Melissa Manchester
Tiffany Darwish 
John Waite
Bob Weir of (Grateful Dead)
Zendaya
Dion
Livingston Taylor 
Constantine Maroulis
GE Smith
Woody Guthrie Family Benefit
Cornell Dupree
Jonny Rosch - Blues Brothers, Cyndi Lauper
Jeff Golub (Rod Stewart's lead guitarist)
Frank Canino - Bass Benny King
Richard Crooke (drummer)
Mark Epstein (bassist)
Roy Bennet Jr. (Singer of the band Stuff)
Oz Noy
Tony Garnier (Bob Dylan's band)
Jon Herrington  of Steely Dan
Charles Giordano
Tiffany Darwish

Performers at The Triad

Peter Boyle
Matthew Broderick
David Carradine
Candy Clark
Tony Darrow
Victor Garber
Gina Gershon
Karen Lynn Gorney
Steve Guttenberg
William Hurt
Richard Kind
John Leguziamo 
Justin Long 
Andrew McCarthy 
Liza Minnelli 
Ralph Macchio 
Marsha Mason  
Annette O'Toole
Rosie Perez
Parker Posey
Ryan Reynolds
Tony Roberts
Paul Rudd
Martin Short
Kristen Wiig
Elizabeth Taylor
Christopher Walken
Treat Williams
Bruce Willis
John Goodman
Judy Gold 
Sandra Bernhard
Joy Behar
Brooke Shields
Susie Essman
Jackie Hoffman
Robert Cuccioli
Carol Kane
David Harbour
Debbie Harry
Anthony Ramos
Doug Bernstein
Alice Ripley
Cast of Jersey Boys
Cast of Rent
Cast of School of Rock
Cast of Good Vibrations
Grand Hotel - CD Cast
Will Shorz

See also
 List of supper clubs

References

External links
 
 

Off-Broadway theaters
Theatres in Manhattan
Upper West Side
Supper clubs